Lai Chi Kok North is one of the 25 constituencies in the Sham Shui Po District of Hong Kong which was created in 2007.

The constituency loosely covers northern part of Lai Chi Kok with the estimated population of 15,472.

Councillors represented

Election results

2010s

2000s

References

Constituencies of Hong Kong
Constituencies of Sham Shui Po District Council
2007 establishments in Hong Kong
Constituencies established in 2007
Lai Chi Kok